The western rock nuthatch (Sitta neumayer) (sometimes known simply as rock nuthatch) is a small passerine bird which breeds from Croatia east through Greece and Turkey to Iran. This nuthatch is largely resident apart from some post-breeding dispersal. The eastern rock nuthatch Sitta tephronota is a separate species, which occurs further east in south-central Asia.

The western rock nuthatch is a bird associated with habitats with bare rocks, especially in mountainous areas. Those at the highest altitudes may move lower down in winter.

It feeds on insects and spiders in summer, supplemented with seeds and snails in winter. It feeds on the ground, and will wedge larger items in rock crevices while it hammers them open with its strong bill. It will also flycatch.

The western rock nuthatch is 13.5 cm long, slightly smaller than Eurasian nuthatch, and has the typical nuthatch big head, short tail and powerful bill and feet. It is long-legged and long-billed compared to most of its relatives.

The race S. n. neumayer of southeast Europe is dark grey above, and has a long strong black eyestripe. It has a white throat and underparts shading to buff on the belly. Sexes are similar, and young birds are slightly duller versions of the adults. Two other races in the west of its Asian range are similar but less well marked.

S.n. tschitscherini of western Iran is paler grey above and has a much weaker eyestripe. S.n. plumbea of southern Iran resembles tschitscherini, but has grey underparts.

This territorial species builds a flask-shaped nest from mud, dung and hair or feathers in a rock crevice, cave, or under an overhang on a rock face. Decorative items may be pushed into crevices and cracks near the entrance to the nest. The nest is lined with softer materials and the entrance is sealed with mud. 4-10 eggs are laid, and are white speckled with yellow.

The western rock nuthatch has a tsik call and a trilled tui tui tui  song. It is common in suitable habitat in most of its range.

Pliny the Elder believed that it was these birds that inspired man to build homes of earth in imitation of the western rock nuthatch's nests.

References
 Tits, Nuthatches and Treecreepers, Harrap and Quinn, 

western rock nuthatch
Birds of Southern Europe
Birds of Georgia (country)
Birds of Azerbaijan
Birds of Western Asia
western rock nuthatch
Taxa named by Karl Michahelles